Grão-Pará is a municipality in the state of Santa Catarina in the South region of Brazil.

The municipality contains part of the  Serra Furada State Park, created in 1980.

See also
List of municipalities in Santa Catarina
Grão-Pará (disambiguation)

References

Municipalities in Santa Catarina (state)